The Sun Way 27 is a French sailboat that was designed by Philippe Harlé as a cruiser and first built in 1987.

The design is a development of the 1981 Fantasia 27, with different portlights, lighter displacement and optimized for cruising.

Production
The design was built by Jeanneau in France, starting in 1987, but it is now out of production.

Design
The Sun Way 27 is a recreational keelboat, built predominantly of fiberglass, with wood trim. It has a masthead sloop rig. The hull has a raked stem, a plumb transom, a transom-hung rudder controlled by a tiller and a fixed fin keel. It displaces  and carries  of ballast.

See also
List of sailing boat types

Similar sailboats
Aloha 27
C&C 27
Cal 27
Cal 2-27
Cal 3-27
Catalina 27
Catalina 270
Catalina 275 Sport
Crown 28
CS 27
Edel 820
Express 27
Halman Horizon
Hotfoot 27
Hullmaster 27
Hunter 27
Hunter 27-2
Hunter 27-3
Irwin 27 
Island Packet 27
Mirage 27 (Perry)
Mirage 27 (Schmidt)
O'Day 272
Orion 27-2
Tanzer 27
Watkins 27
Watkins 27P

References

External links

Photo of a Sun Way 27 showing transom
Photo of a Sun Way 27 showing bow

Keelboats
1980s sailboat type designs
Sailing yachts
Sailboat type designs by Philippe Harlé
Sailboat types built by Jeanneau